The 1980 United States Senate election in Vermont took place on November 4, 1980. Incumbent Democratic U.S. Senator Patrick Leahy narrowly won reelection to a second term, defeating Republican Stewart Ledbetter, the Vermont Commissioner of Banking and Insurance.

Democratic primary

Results

Republican primary

Candidates
T. Garry Buckley, former Lieutenant Governor of Vermont
Anthony Doria, founder of Vermont Law School
Tom Evslin, computer consultant
Stewart Ledbetter, Vermont Banking and Insurance Commissioner
James Mullin, former Chair of the Republican Party of Vermont
Robert Schuettinger, former advisor to the Republican Study Committee

Campaign
The majority of the candidates in the Republican primary field were conservative Republicans, with Ledbetter being seen as the only moderate.

Over the course of the campaign, a dispute broke out between T. Garry Buckley, a former Lieutenant Governor, and James Mullin, the former Vermont GOP Chair. Buckley vigoriously attacked Mullin for being a Mormon, claiming that if elected Mullin would be the "third Senator from Utah." Mullin in turned accused Buckley of bigotry, stating "I thought this nonsense went out when Jack Kennedy was elected President."

Endorsements

Results

Liberty Union primary

Results

General election

Results

See also 
 1980 United States Senate elections

References 

Vermont
1980
1980 Vermont elections